HMS Viper was a 6-gun galley, the former South Carolina Navys Rutledge, which the British captured on 4 November 1779 at Tybee. She was broken up in 1785.

Capture

Myrtle and Rutledge had been blown out to sea a few days earlier. They returned to Tybee, not realising that it was now in British hands, and were captured.

Service
Curiously, a number of sources list the galley Viper  among the vessels under the command of Captain John Henry when the French fleet under the Comte d'Estaing besieged Savannah in September–October 1779.

The Royal Navy commissioned Viper on 18 November 1779 under the command of Lieutenant Charles Wroughton.

"HM Armed Galley Viper", Acting Lieutenant Thomas Chambers, was among the vessels at the Siege of Charleston, 28 March to 12 May 1780. She then was listed in 1781 as being with Admiral Parker at Jamaica and under the command of W. Bowman. For the next two years she is listed as being under the command of W.R. Dunlop and part of the North America squadron under Rear-Admiral of the Red Robert Rigby.

Fate
Viper was paid-off in May 1784. She was broken up in 1785.

Citations

References
 
Schomberg, Isaac (1802) Naval chronology: or, An historical summary of naval & maritime events, from the time of the Romans, to the Treaty of Peace, 1802. (Printed for T. Egerton by C. Roworth).
 

Captured ships
Navy
Military units and formations of the United States in the American Revolutionary War
Navy
Galleys of the Royal Navy